Neptunea antiqua, common name the red whelk, is a species of Northeast Atlantic sea snail, a marine gastropod mollusk in the family Buccinidae, the true whelks.

Description
N. antiqua resembles Buccinum undatum (common whelk). It is the largest marine snail in parts of its range.

Distribution

Feeding
N. antiqua is primarily a scavenger, although it has been recorded attacking and eating some living polychaete species. Unlike several of its more predatory relatives, experiments have shown that even hungry N. antiqua are not attracted to living undamaged mussels.

Food poisoning

N. antiqua contains tetramethylammonium salts (most likely the chloride) in its tissues, and has been the source of non-lethal human poisoning.

References

Buccinidae
Gastropods described in 1758
Taxa named by Carl Linnaeus